Braima Candé (born 4 September 1995) is a Bissau-Guinean-born Portuguese professional footballer who plays as a right back.

Club career
On 26 March 2017, Candé made his professional debut with Kallithea in a Greece Football League match against OFI.

References

External links

1995 births
Living people
Sportspeople from Bissau
Portuguese footballers
Portugal youth international footballers
Bissau-Guinean footballers
Bissau-Guinean emigrants to Portugal
Portuguese sportspeople of Bissau-Guinean descent
Association football fullbacks
FC Porto B players
S.C. Freamunde players
SC Mirandela players
Juventude de Pedras Salgadas players
Kallithea F.C. players
Liga Portugal 2 players
Campeonato de Portugal (league) players
Football League (Greece) players